Peter Wade Keusch, more commonly known as Peter Wade, is a record producer, recording engineer, mixer, songwriter and A&R.  His artist development projects include MNDR, Party Nails and numerous songwriters and producers signed to his record label WonderSound and publishing company 120 Music.  Wade's production and writing credits include Kid Ink, Jennifer Lopez, Martin Solveig, Kylie Minogue, and Flume.

Wade has been a part of three Grammy winning albums with Marc Anthony (two Latin) and won a trophy for his participation on Valio La Pena. He has been a guest speaker at the ASCAP Paul Cunningham Songwriter Workshop and The Grammy Professional Development Series.  In 2008 he was published in Bruce Swedien's second book, In The Studio With Michael Jackson, and also contributed photography to Swedien's first book Make Mine Music.

Wade owns and operates a record label, WonderSound, and a music publishing company, 120 Music.

Selected discography
 RAC - "Unusual feat. MNDR" (2017) Writer, Vocal Producer
 Martin Solveig - "All Stars feat. Alma" (2017) Writer
 MNDR & Scissor Sisters - "SWERLK" (2017) Producer, Composer
 Charli XCX - "Babygirl feat. Uffie" (2017) - Writer
 Flume - "Like Water feat. MNDR" (2016) Vocal Producer, Writer - GRAMMY WINNER
 Jai Wolf - "Like It's Over feat. MNDR" (2016) Writer, Vocal Producer
 Brooke Candy - "Rubber Band Stacks" Single (2015) Vocal Producer, Writer
 Sweet Valley - "Dance 4 a Dollar" EP (2015) Vocal Producer, Writer
 Penguin Prison - "Never Gets Old" (2015) Producer, Composer
 Kid Ink - "POV" (2015) Producer, Composer
 E! Fashion Police - Theme Music (2015) Producer, Composer
 Michna - "Solid Gold feat. MNDR" (2015) Vocal Producer, Writer
 Kylie Minogue - "Wait" (2014) Writer
 Little Boots - "Heroine" (2014) Producer, Writer, Engineer
 Dev - "Gimmie Some" (2014) Writer
 Spragga Benz - "Pop It Off" & "Pop It Off REMIX (feat. Smoke DZA & Sierra Leone)" (2014) Producer, Mixer, Engineer, Writer
 Spragga Benz - "Nothin' But Love (Feat. Black Pearl)" (2014) Producer, Mixer, Engineer
 Dev - "Feel It" (2014) Writer
 Kylie Minogue - "Les Sex" (2014) Vocal Producer, Writer
 Sean Paul - "Legacy" (2014) Writer
 LIZ - "Turn Around" (2014) Writer
 RAC - "Let Go (feat. MNDR)" - (2013) (single) Writer, Vocal Producer
 Tokimonsta - "Go With It (feat. MNDR)" - (2013) (single) Writer, Vocal Producer
 Seasick Mama - "Man Overboard", "Gimme Something More" (2013) Producer, Writer, Engineer
 MNDR - "Feed Me Diamonds" (album) (2012) Producer, Writer, Engineer, Artist
Psychobuildings - "Hearts" (EP) (2012) Producer, Writer, Engineer, Mixer
 Make Out - "You Can't Be Friends With Everyone", "You're So Party Tonight" (2011) Producer, Engineer, Mixer
 Mark Ronson & The Business Intl. - "Bang Bang Bang feat. MNDR and Q-Tip" (2010) Producer, Writer, Engineer
 Melanie Fiona - "Monday Morning" (2009) Producer, Writer, Engineer
 88-keys - "The Friends Zone" and "Morning Wood" (2008) Producer, Writer, Engineer
 Taylor Dayne - "She Doesn't Love You", "Dedicated" (2008) Producer, Writer, Engineer, Mixer
 Jennifer Lopez - "Never Gonna Give Up", "The Way It Is", "Be Mine", "I Need Love", "Frozen Moments (iTunes bonus)" (2007) Producer, Writer, Engineer
 Shitake Monkey - "Street Beef" (album) (2007) Producer, Writer, Mixer, Engineer, Artist
 Natasha Bedingfield - "The One That Got Away" (2005) Producer, Mixer
 Lindsay Lohan - "Rumors" (2004) Producer, Mixer
 Spragga Benz - "Y" aka "Why" feat. Carly Simon (2003) Producer, Mixer, Engineer
 Marc Anthony - "Libre", "Mended", "Valio La Pena", "Amar Sin Mentiras", "El Cantante" (2003 - 2008) Engineer

Remixes
Home Video - "Forget (MNDR Remix)" - 2014
Living Days - "Thrill Anybody (MNDR Remix)" - 2014
The Bloody Beetroots - "Keep On Dancing feat. Drop The Lime (MNDR Remix)" - 2014
Safety Scissors - "Gemini (MNDR & Peter Wade Remix)" - 2014
Conway - "Big Talk (Peter Wade of MNDR Remix) - 2013
Mavado - "Cheat On Me (feat. Spice) (WonderSound Remix)" - 2013
Metric - "Breathing Underwater (MNDR Remix)" - 2013
MNDR - "Feed Me Diamonds (Peter Wade Remix)" -2013
TV Mania - "Beautiful Clothes (Peter Wade MNDR Remix)" - 2013
French Horn Rebellion vs. Database - "Poster Girl (Peter Wade Remix)" - 2013
Childish Gambino - "Heartbeat (Peter Wade Remix)" - 2012
Foster the People - "Pumped Up Kicks (MNDR 4-Track Remix)" - 2011
Willie Colón - "La Murga (MNDR Whole Step Remix)" - 2011
Austra - "Spellwork (MNDR Nighttime Remix)" - 2011
Freelance Whales - "Hannah (Peter Wade of MNDR Remix)" - 2010
Revl9n - "Waiting For Desire (Sizzler's - Surf N' Turf Version)" - 2008
Yoko Ono - "O'Oh (with Shitake Monkey)" - 2007
Jennifer Lopez - "Play feat. Slick Rick (Sack International Remix)" - 2002

References

Year of birth missing (living people)
Living people
Record producers
American lyricists
Remixers
Latin Grammy Award winners